Christina Marie Kelly (born November 13, 1991) is an American voice actress who provides voices for English dubs of anime for Sentai Filmworks and Funimation.

Biography
Kelly was born in Newport Beach, California on November 13, 1991. She attended the University of Houston School of Theatre and Dance, where she has appeared in shows such as The Miser, Blood Wedding, Ring Round the Moon, and Zombie Prom: The Musical. She graduated with a BFA in acting in 2015.

In 2015, Kelly began voice acting with Sentai Filmworks while still attending the University of Houston. Her first lead role was Satone Shichimiya in the hit series Love, Chunibyo & Other Delusions -Heart Throb-. She had only been voice acting for four months when she landed the lead role of Mine in the action anime Akame ga Kill!, which would appear on Adult Swim's Toonami programming block. She was also the voice of Koko Kaga in the romantic-comedy, Golden Time. Her talent became noted by directors from Dallas, which led her to land the role of Yamato in Kancolle, a dub produced by Funimation.

Kelly has appeared on stage at Unity Theatre and The Catastrophic Theatre in Houston, Texas.

Dubbing roles

Anime

Video games

Awards and nominations

References

External links
 
 

1991 births
21st-century American actresses
Actresses from Orange County, California
Actresses from Houston
American voice actresses
Living people
People from Orange County, California
University of Houston alumni
People from Newport Beach, California
American people of Italian descent